Domino Island is a first-person narrative novel written by English author Desmond Bagley, and was first published posthumously in 2019. Originally drafted in 1972, the novel was discovered by Philip Eastwood in 2017 among the author's archived papers at the Howard Gotlieb Archival Research Center in Boston, USA. Eastwood found a typed first draft with handwritten annotations by Bagley and his original editor, Bob Knittel. There was also correspondence between the two discussing plans for the second draft. Michael Davis acted as "curator" to bring the novel to publication.

HarperCollins first released news of the unpublished thriller on 12 October 2018 at the Frankfurt Book Fair (Frankfurter Buchmesse). It was published on 9 May 2019.

Plot introduction
Bill Kemp, an ex-serviceman working in London as an insurance investigator, is sent to the Caribbean to determine the legitimacy of an expensive life insurance claim following the inexplicable death of businessman David Salton. His rapidly inflated premiums immediately before his death stand to make his young widow Jill Salton very wealthy. Once there, Kemp discovers that Salton's political ambitions had made him a lot of enemies, and local tensions around a forthcoming election are already spilling over into protest and violence on the streets. Kemp eventually realises that Salton's death and the local unrest are a deliberate smokescreen for an altogether more ambitious plot by an enemy in their midst.

References

External links
Domino Island review at The Deighton Dossier
Fantastic Fiction site with publication history

2019 British novels
Novels by Desmond Bagley
Novels published posthumously
Novels set in the Caribbean
HarperCollins books